Mahkan is a Syrian town located in Mayadin District, Deir ez-Zor.  According to the Syria Central Bureau of Statistics (CBS), Mahkan had a population of 10,086 in the 2004 census. During Syria Civil war, Mahkan was occupied by ISIS and was captured by Syrian Army  on 23 October 2017.

References 

Populated places in Deir ez-Zor Governorate
Populated places on the Euphrates River